Neutra is a surname. Notable people with the surname include:

 Richard Neutra (1892–1970), Austrian-American architect
 Dion Neutra (1926–2019), American architect

See also 

 Neutra, the German name for Nitra, a city in Slovakia
 Neutra Phos, a powder formulation of sodium and potassium phosphate